|}

The Punchestown Champion Chase, currently known for sponsorship purposes as the William Hill Champion Chase,  is a Grade 1 National Hunt steeplechase in Ireland which is open to horses aged five years or older. It is run at Punchestown over a distance of about 2 miles (3,219 metres) and during its running there are eleven fences to be jumped. The race is scheduled to take place each year during the Punchestown Festival in late April.

It was formerly a handicap race, and for much of the 1990s and early 2000s it was usually sponsored by BMW. It became a conditions race in 1999, and it was subsequently backed by Betdaq (2004) and Kerrygold (2005–09) and Boylesports (2010–19). The present sponsor, William Hill, began to support the event in 2021.

The field usually includes horses which ran previously in the Queen Mother Champion Chase, and the last to win both races in the same year was Energumene in 2022.

Records
Most successful horse since 1950 (2 wins):
 Shower of Silver – 1955, 1956
 Muir – 1969, 1970
 Skymas – 1972, 1973
 Light the Wad – 1981, 1982
 Klairon Davis – 1996, 1997
 Sizing Europe - 2012, 2014
 Un de Sceaux - 2018, 2019

Leading jockey since 1950 (5 wins):
 Pat Taaffe – Third Estate (1951), Tumble Weed (1953), Nas Na Riogh (1954), Fortria (1961), Dicky May (1966)

Leading trainer since 1950 (7 wins):
 Willie Mullins - Micko's Dream (2001), Golden Silver (2010), Felix Yonger (2015), Un de Sceaux (2018,2019), Chacun Pour Soi (2021), Energumene (2022)

Winners since 1980

Earlier winners

 1950 – Melman
 1951 – Third Estate
 1952 – Clonfert
 1953 – Tumble Weed
 1954 – Nas Na Riogh
 1955 – Shower of Silver
 1956 – Shower of Silver
 1957 – Jack's the Boy
 1958 – Hern's Gift
 1959 – Marchioness Bay
 1960 – Some Other Day
 1961 – Fortria
 1962 – Highfield Lad
 1963 – Scottish Memories
 1964 – Flying Wind
 1965 – Belle Artiste
 1966 – Dicky May
 1967 – Ronan
 1968 – Black Ice
 1969 – Muir
 1970 – Muir
 1971 – East Bound
 1972 – Skymas
 1973 – Skymas
 1974 – Tingle Creek
 1975 – Our Albert
 1976 – High School
 1977 – Simaroon
 1978 – Shining Flame
 1979 – Scottish Maid

See also
 Horse racing in Ireland
 List of Irish National Hunt races

References
 Racing Post:
, 

 pedigreequery.com – Kerrygold Champion Chase – Punchestown.
 racenewsonline.co.uk – Racenews Archive (April 25, 2003).

National Hunt races in Ireland
National Hunt chases
Punchestown Racecourse